Donald Edward Cutts (born February 24, 1953) is a Canadian former professional ice hockey goaltender who played 6 games in the National Hockey League with the Edmonton Oilers during the 1979–80 season. Cutts was selected in the seventh round of the 1973 NHL Amateur Draft, 97th overall, by the New York Islanders and in the fourth round of the 1973 WHA Amateur Draft, 48th overall, by the Houston Aeros. He had a seven-year professional career which lasted from 1974 to 1982, largely in the minor leagues

Cutts best minor league season was in the International Hockey League in 1975–76 with the Muskegon Mohawks, where he was named to the IHL First All-Star Team. He also set his best personal mark for games started, with 58. He retired in 1982.

Career statistics

Regular season and playoffs

Awards and honors

References

External links 

Don Cutts biography at Hockey Draft Central

1953 births
Living people
Canadian ice hockey goaltenders
Edmonton Oilers players
Fort Wayne Komets players
Fort Worth Texans players
Houston Aeros draft picks
Houston Apollos players
Kalamazoo Wings (1974–2000) players
Lahti Pelicans players
Muskegon Mohawks players
New York Islanders draft picks
Oklahoma City Stars players
RPI Engineers men's ice hockey players
Ice hockey people from Edmonton